California's 39th State Assembly district is one of 80 California State Assembly districts. It is currently represented by Democrat Luz Rivas of North Hollywood.

District profile 
The district encompasses the northeastern San Fernando Valley, running up into the San Gabriel Mountains. This heavily Latino district forms a major corridor between Los Angeles and points further north.

Los Angeles County – 4.8%
 Los Angeles – 11.6%
 Arleta
 Lake View Terrace
 Mission Hills
 North Hollywood – partial
 Pacoima
 Sun Valley
 Sunland-Tujunga
 Sylmar
 San Fernando

Election results from statewide races

List of Assembly Members 
Due to redistricting, the 39th district has been moved around different parts of the state. The current iteration resulted from the 2011 redistricting by the California Citizens Redistricting Commission.

Election results 1992 - present

2020

2018

2018 (special)

2016

2014

2012

2010

2008

2007 (special)

2006

2004

2002

2000

1998

1996

1994

1992

See also 
 California State Assembly
 California State Assembly districts
 Districts in California

References

External links 
 District map from the California Citizens Redistricting Commission

39
Government of Los Angeles County, California
Government of Los Angeles
Crescenta Valley
San Fernando Valley
Arleta, Los Angeles
Lake View Terrace, Los Angeles
Mission Hills, Los Angeles
North Hollywood, Los Angeles
Pacoima, Los Angeles
San Fernando, California
Sun Valley, Los Angeles
Sunland-Tujunga, Los Angeles
Sylmar